The Ellingsøy Tunnel is a subsea road tunnel in Ålesund Municipality in Møre og Romsdal county, Norway. The tunnel runs between the center of the city of Ålesund on the island of Nørvøya and the village of Hoffland on the island of Ellingsøya. It is part of National Road 658 and was constructed as part of the Vigra Fixed Link project, which connected several outlying islands to the city of Ålesund and the mainland of Norway. The tunnel opened in 1987 and it was a toll road until 25 October 2009. The steepest parts of the tunnel do not exceed an 8.5% grade. 
The Ellingsøy Tunnel has a corkscrew spiral under the Hoffland island to span vertical height.

References

Subsea tunnels in Norway
Road tunnels in Møre og Romsdal
Norwegian County Road 658
1987 establishments in Norway
Tunnels completed in 1987
Buildings and structures in Ålesund
Former toll tunnels